Abish Ahmad District is in Kaleybar County, East Azerbaijan province, Iran. At the 2006 National Census, its population was 25,122 in 5,308 households. The following census in 2011 counted 22,185 people in 5,519 households. At the latest census in 2016, the district had 21,828 inhabitants in 6,313 households.

References 

Kaleybar County

Districts of East Azerbaijan Province

Populated places in East Azerbaijan Province

Populated places in Kaleybar County